Luxe Listings Sydney is a real estate lifestyle reality show on Amazon Prime Video premiered on 9 July 2021. The series follows real estate agents D'Leanne Lewis, Gavin Rubenstein and buyer's agent Simon Cohen as they hustle, negotiate and deal in their quest for success in the Sydney property market.

Current realtors
Main
 Simon Cohen, 2021—present
 D'Leanne Lewis, 2021—present
 Gavin Rubinsten, 2021—present
 Monika Tu, 2022—present
Recurring
 Shani Asadon, 2021—present
 Patrick Cosgrove, 2021—present
 Oliver Lavers, 2021—present
 Remi Lindsay, 2021—present
 Tammy Soglanich, 2021—present
 Cae Thomas, 2021—present
 Jacob Hannon, 2022—present
 Sebastian Maxwell, 2022—present
 Tas Costi, 2022—present
 Noa Oziel, 2022—present
 Ching Ching Yui, 2022—present

Overview and casting

Season 1–present
The first season premiered on July 1, 2021, and consisted of buyer's agent Simon Cohen, and real estate agents D'Leanne Lewis and Gavin Rubinstein, with Shani Asadon, Patrick Cosgrove, Daniella Jooste, Oliver Lavers, Remi Lindsay, Jarryd Rubinstein, Tammy Soglanich, Cae Thomas and Evan Williams as supporting realtors. Prime Video AU & NZ renewed the series for a second season 2 days later, stating that Luxe Listings Sydney was its highest viewed series in the history of its Amazon Originals' premieres.

The second season saw the return of all existing dork realtors, with the exception of Jooste, and the addition of the show's newest sales and buying agent, Monika Tu. The series returned April 1, 2022. Jacob Hannon and Sebastian Maxwell were added to the cast in recurring capacities, whilst Jarryd Rubinstein made a guest appearance.

Prime Video AU & NZ announced that the show was renewed for a third season, 2 days prior to the release of season 2. An October/November release date was expected for season 3, as executive producers stated that Prime Video is currently looking to expand the series with Canadian and European spin-offs. The first 3 episodes of the third season were released on September 30, 2022; followed by a week-by-week release of the remaining 3 episodes. The cast remained the same as the previous season, with the addition of Tas Costi, Noa Oziel and Ching Ching Yiu as supporting realtors. Evan Williams was demoted to a guest role following claims of alleged domestic abuse and a verbal altercation between himself, Thomas and another colleague, Jye Emdur; that occurred whilst filming the third season. It is reported that the altercation broke out following Williams claiming Thomas and Emdur "were pinching what he thought were his listings".

Realtors

Timeline of realtors
  = Main cast (credited) 
  = Recurring cast (3+)
  = Guest cast (1–2)

Episodes

References

External links

Eureka Productions
Kentel

2020s Australian reality television series
2021 Australian television series debuts
Amazon Prime Video original programming
English-language television shows
Television shows set in Sydney
Television series by Eureka
Television series by Amazon Studios
Property buying television shows
Sydney-related lists